Jacob Adam Surjan (born 15 August 1985) is a former professional Australian rules footballer who played for the Port Adelaide Football Club in the Australian Football League (AFL). He currently serves as the senior coach at the North Adelaide Football Club.

Early career
Surjan began his football career for Cockburn Junior Football Club at the age of 13 before transferring to the South Coogee Junior Football Club. Both clubs are part of the South Fremantle Bulldogs development district zone in Western Australia. He was scouted as part of the South Fremantle Warriors WAFL development program playing for South Fremantle. He progressed from the under 13's through the colts (U/18's). In 2003, Surjan made his WAFL league debut as a 17-year-old playing for the South Fremantle Bulldogs. His best performance was a 4-goal, 16 possession, 8 mark haul against Perth. In the same year, he won the Mel Whinnen medal for his best on ground performance in the South Fremantle Colts 2003 WAFL premiership side. He averaged 31 possessions for the season at Colts level.

Jacob was part of the WA Under-18 National Championships squad, putting in two very good performances at the carnival, before injuring a calf and having a reasonably quiet 3rd game.

AFL career
After being touted as a potential top 30 pick, putting in many impressive draft camp results, it came as a shock to many when Surjan was overlooked in the 2003 National Draft. It was then that Port Adelaide pounced and selected Surjan as the number 10 pick in the 2004 AFL Pre-Season Draft.

Surjan made his AFL debut in round 1, 2004 against . He went on to play 5 of the first 7 games, before a knee injury cut his season short after showing much promise.

In 2005, he had an indifferent year due to injuries. A switch from SANFL clubs Central District to Port Adelaide Magpies was a welcome change, with "Surj" running into form in the second half of the season with the Magpies, with a plethora of BOG performances.

The hard chasing, strong tackling midfielder and small defender was nominated for the AFL Rising Star award in 2006 for his 26-disposal game from half-back against  in round 11.

In the 2007 AFL season, Surjan played 24 of a possible 25 games, totalling 417 disposals at an average of 17.4 disposals per game, 5 marks and 3 tackles. He finished 7th in the Port Adelaide fairest and best and was top 3 in both the one-percenter and most improved awards.

Season 2008 marked an indifferent year for Port Adelaide and Surjan however, he finished off the year strongly playing 19 of 22 games averaging 15 disposals, 4 marks and 2 tackles.

Jacob's game has been typified with explosive pace, ferocious tackling and an ability to win the contested football. He has become an important member of the Port Adelaide defence playing as the shut down defender, rated highly throughout the league for his ability to curb dangerous small forwards, his uncompromising attitude all the while sacrificing his body in the contest to help out teammates.

In the lead up to the 2010 season, Surjan was announced as vice-captain of the club.

He was delisted at the end of the 2012 season.

Coaching

From 2012 to 2013, Surjan remained at Port Adelaide as a development coach for their SANFL division. In 2014 he was named Port Adelaide's academy coach. A year later, he was named as Port Adelaide's AFL development coach and the line coach for their SANFL side.

In 2017, Surjan became reserves coach and league assistant coach at the North Adelaide Football Club. In 2018, he guided the North Adelaide reserves team to a grand final win against Norwood and also helped former teammate and North Adelaide senior coach Josh Carr to the 2018 SANFL Grand Final win also over flag favourite Norwood.
In 2019 Surjan was appointed as senior coach for the North Adelaide Roosters for the 2020 SANFL season on a three-year contract.

Other sports

He won the national under-16 long jump championships in 2000 and also competed in the sprint hurdles. Jacob's older brother Erik Surjan, is an Australian decathlon champion.

References

External links

Jacob Surjan's profile on the official website of the Port Adelaide Football Club

1985 births
Living people
Port Adelaide Football Club players
Port Adelaide Football Club players (all competitions)
Australian people of Croatian descent
South Fremantle Football Club players
Australian rules footballers from Perth, Western Australia